This is a list of Scottish football transfers featuring at least one 2014–15 Scottish Premiership club or one 2014–15 Scottish Championship club which were completed during the summer 2014 transfer window. The summer window closed at 23:00 BST on Monday 1 September 2014.

List

See also
 List of Scottish football transfers winter 2013–14
 List of Scottish football transfers winter 2014–15

References

External links
Scottish Premiership ins and outs - summer 2014, BBC Sport
Scottish Championship ins and outs - summer 2014, BBC Sport

Transfers
Scottish
2014 in Scottish sport
2014 summer